Fatima Airport  is an airport serving the mission village of Fatima in the Beni Department of Bolivia. The runway extends northeast from the mission, within a bend of the small Chimanes River, which shortly feeds into the Rapulo River. There are no roads into Fatima.

The Fatima Mission tends to the needs of the Tsimane, an isolated tribe of Bolivian Amerindians in the eastern Andes foothills.

See also

Transport in Bolivia
List of airports in Bolivia

References

External links
OpenStreetMap - Fatima
OurAirports - Fatima
FallingRain - Fatima Airport
HERE/Nokia - Fatima

Airports in Beni Department